Stu Rasmussen (September 9, 1948 – November 17, 2021) was an American politician. He became the nation's first openly transgender mayor when he was elected as the mayor of Silverton, Oregon in November 2008. 

He had previously been elected twice in the 1990s as mayor of this Willamette Valley community, before coming out as transgender. He was also three times a member of the city council. He was assigned male at birth, identified as a man, preferred masculine pronouns, had breast implants, and had a feminine gender expression. He sometimes went by the name Carla Fong.

Rasmussen unsuccessfully ran for a seat in the Oregon House of Representatives in 1994 as an independent, and a seat in the Oregon State Senate in 1996 as a Democrat. He ran for the House again in 1998 as a Democrat, losing with 41% of the vote.

In 2013 a musical about Rasmussen, Stu for Silverton, premiered at Seattle's Intiman Theatre.

Rasmussen, a self-described fiscal conservative and social liberal, served as city councilor until January 2009. 

He co-owned Silverton's 1936 Palace Theater, which shows first-run movies, since 1974.

Rasmussen died from prostate cancer on November 17, 2021, at the age of 73.

References

External links 
 Stu Rasmussen for Mayor

 WNYC Radiolab segment on Stu Rasmussen
 Interview with Stu Rasmussen About Being a Transgender Politician

1948 births
2021 deaths
Mayors of places in Oregon
Transgender politicians
LGBT mayors of places in the United States
LGBT people from Oregon
People from Silverton, Oregon
Oregon city council members
Oregon Democrats
Oregon Independents
Male-to-female cross-dressers
20th-century American politicians
21st-century American politicians